Harris House is a historic home located at Sedalia, Pettis County, Missouri.  It was built about 1895, and is a three-story, Queen Anne style brick dwelling.  It features a two-story tower, turreted oriel window, sweeping verandah, and porte cochere. Also on the property is a contributing carriage house.

It was listed on the National Register of Historic Places in 1979.

References

Houses on the National Register of Historic Places in Missouri
Queen Anne architecture in Missouri
Houses completed in 1895
Buildings and structures in Pettis County, Missouri
National Register of Historic Places in Pettis County, Missouri